Fernando Gaston Soler (born February 24, 1978 in Buenos Aires) is an Argentine former football player who currently is the assistant coach for Persib Bandung. Since 2010, he holds a CONMEBOL A coaching license.

Coaching career 
On December 7, 2014, he became the coach assistant for Arcan Iurie in Pusamania Borneo.

References

External links 
 

1978 births
Living people
Footballers from Buenos Aires
Argentine footballers
Argentine expatriate footballers
Expatriate footballers in Indonesia
Expatriate footballers in Costa Rica
Expatriate footballers in South Korea
Association football forwards
Liga 1 (Indonesia) players
Borneo F.C. players